Trichoglottis pusilla is a species of miniature epiphyte in the family Orchidaceae, endemic to the islands Java and Sumatra of Indonesia. A short stem bears oblong, fleshy leaves. Two flowers with red lines are produced on racemes. The labellum is obovate and fleshy. The specific epithet pusilla, meaning small or tiny, refers to this species diminutive size.

Conservation
The IUCN has not assessed this species conservation status. It is however protected unter the CITES appendix II regulations of international trade.

References

pusilla
Endemic flora of Indonesia
Orchids of Indonesia